The Mayor of Nashville is the chief executive of Nashville Tennessee's government. The current mayor is John Cooper, a member of the Democratic party. Each mayor serves a term of four years, with a limit of two terms, unless this is interrupted by a legal mechanism, such as a recall election.

Mayors of the City of Nashville
The following is a list of the mayors of Nashville before it had a consolidated metropolitan government:

Pre-Civil War

Civil War and Reconstruction

Post-Reconstruction

Mayors of Metropolitan Nashville
The following is a list of the mayors of Nashville after the consolidation of the municipal government with the government of Davidson County:

See also
 Timeline of Nashville, Tennessee

Bibliography
 

Nashville, Tennessee